Kallinikos I (? – 23 August 705) was the Ecumenical Patriarch of Constantinople from 693 to 705.

Callinicus helped to depose Emperor Justinian II and place Leontios on the Byzantine throne.

Upon Justinian's triumphant return to Constantinople and reinstatement as Emperor, Callinicus was arrested and blinded before being imprisoned in a monastery.

He is recognized as a saint by the Eastern Orthodox Church; his feast day is celebrated on August 23.

Bibliography
Notes

References

 - Total pages: 256 

7th-century patriarchs of Constantinople

Twenty Years' Anarchy
Byzantine prisoners and detainees
Byzantine saints of the Eastern Orthodox Church